The 2000–01 Cypriot Fourth Division was the 16th season of the Cypriot fourth-level football league. Sourouklis Troullon won their 1st title.

Format
Fourteen teams participated in the 2000–01 Cypriot Fourth Division. All teams played against each other twice, once at their home and once away. The team with the most points at the end of the season crowned champions. The first three teams were promoted to the 2001–02 Cypriot Third Division and the last three teams were relegated to regional leagues.

Point system
Teams received three points for a win, one point for a draw and zero points for a loss.

Changes from previous season
Teams promoted to 2000–01 Cypriot Third Division
 MEAP Nisou
 Elia Lythrodonta
 THOI Lakatamia
 AMEP Parekklisia

Teams relegated from 1999–2000 Cypriot Third Division
 Achyronas Liopetriou
 Ellinismos Akakiou
 Doxa Paliometochou

Teams promoted from regional leagues
 Anagennisi Lythrodonta
 Anagennisi Prosfigon Lemesou
 ASPIS Pylas
 Sourouklis Troullon

Teams relegated to regional leagues
 AEK Kythreas
 Orfeas Nicosia
 PAOK Kalou Choriou

League standings

Results

See also
 Cypriot Fourth Division
 2000–01 Cypriot First Division
 2000–01 Cypriot Cup

Sources

Cypriot Fourth Division seasons
Cyprus
2000–01 in Cypriot football